Executive Order 14036, titled Executive Order on Promoting Competition in the American Economy and sometimes referred to as the Executive Order on Competition, is the fifty-first executive order signed by U.S. President Joe Biden. Signed on July 9, 2021, the order serves to establish a "whole-of-government effort to promote competition in the American economy" by encouraging stronger enforcement of antitrust law.

The executive order directs over a dozen federal agencies, including the Federal Trade Commission (FTC), to take action on 72 separate initiatives identified by the Biden Administration as beneficial to reining in anti-competitive practices. Specific initiatives in the executive order include efforts to limit non-compete clauses, allow for hearing aids to be sold over the counter, and revive net neutrality. The order has been interpreted as supportive of the "right to repair" movement, which seeks to prohibit companies from making products prohibitively difficult to repair in order to encourage consumers to purchase new products.

The order additionally establishes the White House Competition Council, a fifteen-member committee led by National Economic Council (NEC) director Brian Deese.

Background 
Antitrust enforcement in the United States began to decline in the 1970s, which coincided with the rise of the laissez-faire "consumer welfare standard" as the dominant approach to antitrust issues. In the 2010s,  concerns surrounding corporate concentration and wealth inequality led to a revived interest in antitrust enforcement. During the 2020 Democratic presidential primary, multiple contenders including then-candidate Biden indicated support for strengthening antitrust enforcement in the tech sector.

As President, Biden appointed vocal proponents of antitrust enforcement to advisory and regulatory roles, including Tim Wu as an advisor at the NEC and Lina Khan as chairwoman of the FTC. Wu helped author Executive Order 14036 and has assisted with its implementation.

Provisions 
Containing 72 provisions, the executive order was said to be "striking in its scope and ambition" by The Washington Post.

Antitrust enforcement 
The order calls on the FTC and the Department of Justice (DOJ) to "enforce the antitrust laws vigorously and recognizes that the law allows them to challenge prior bad mergers that past administrations did not previously challenge" in areas such as the tech sector, labor markets, and the healthcare industry. 

The executive order cites research by the American Economic Liberties Project (AELP), an anti-monopoly organization, that found that the median U.S. household loses $5,000 a year from wages that are lowered as a result of a lack of competition.

Agriculture 
Under the executive order, the Department of Agriculture (USDA) is directed to consider new department rules that would strengthen enforcement of the Packers and Stockyards Act in order to make it easier for farmers to bring and win claims. The FTC is additionally directed to consider new initiatives to prevent equipment manufacturing companies from restricting farmers from repairing their tractors.

Net neutrality and broadband 
The executive order encourages the Federal Communications Commission (FCC) to reinstate federal net neutrality regulations. According to Vice, the order prohibits telecom companies from levying early elimination penalties on consumers, and urges the FCC to implement rules "that would have required ISPs include a “nutrition label” on broadband connections".

Reception and analysis 
According to Politico, the order marks "the most ambitious effort in generations to reduce the stranglehold of monopolies and concentrated markets in major industries", and could be interpreted as a leftward shift by the Biden Administration on economic policy.

Senator Elizabeth Warren of Massachusetts praised the order as a critical step towards reinvigorating competition. Neil Bradley, who serves as chief policy officer for the Chamber of Commerce, criticized the order and accused the White House of taking a “government-knows-best approach” at the expense of American businesses.

White House Competition Council 

The executive order created the White House Competition Council to coordinate inter-agency efforts to promote competition. The chair of the White House Competition Council is Brian Deese, the director of the National Economic Council. The council is currently composed of the following individuals:

Cabinet officials 

 Janet Yellen, Secretary of the Treasury 
 Marty Walsh, Secretary of Labor
 Gina Raimondo, Secretary of Commerce
 Tom Vilsack, Secretary of Agriculture
 Pete Buttigieg, Secretary of Transportation 
 Lloyd Austin, Secretary of Defense
 Xavier Becerra, Secretary of Health and Human Services
 Merrick Garland, Attorney General

Advisors and heads of federal agencies 

 Cecilia Rouse, Chairwoman of the Council of Economic Advisers (CEA)
 Shalanda Young, Director of the Office of Management and Budget (OMB)
 Lina Khan, Chairwoman of the Federal Trade Commission (FTC)
 Gary Gensler, Chairman of the Securities and Exchange Commission (SEC)
 Jessica Rosenworcel, Chairwoman of the Federal Communications Commission (FCC)
 Martin J. Oberman, Chairman of the Surface Transportation Board (STB)
 Dan Maffei, Chairman of the Federal Maritime Commission (FMC)
 Rostin Behnam, Chairman of the Commodity Futures Trading Commission (CFTC)
 Rohit Chopra, Director of the Consumer Financial Protection Bureau (CFPB)

See also 

 List of executive actions by Joe Biden
 United States antitrust law

References 

Executive orders of Joe Biden
2021 in American law
July 2021 events in the United States
United States antitrust law